Kendon R. Underwood is an American attorney and politician serving as a member of the Arkansas House of Representatives from the 90th district. Elected in November 2020, he assumed office on January 11, 2021.

Early life and education 
Underwood was born and raised in Arkansas. He earned a Bachelor of Arts degree from the University of Arkansas and a Juris Doctor from the University of Arkansas School of Law.

Career 
In 2014, Underwood served as a judicial extern for the Arkansas 19th Judicial Circuit West. In 2015 and 2016, he was an attorney at the Slinkard Law Firm in Rogers, Arkansas. From 2016 to 2018, he was an associate attorney at the Woodard Law Group in Bentonville, Arkansas. Since 2018, he has worked as corporate counsel at J. B. Hunt. Underwood was elected to the Arkansas House of Representatives in November 2020 and assumed office on January 11, 2021.

Personal life 
Underwood lives in Cave Springs, Arkansas.

References 

Living people
University of Arkansas alumni
University of Arkansas School of Law alumni
People from Cave Springs, Arkansas
Arkansas lawyers
Republican Party members of the Arkansas House of Representatives
21st-century American politicians
Year of birth missing (living people)